Clypeostoma reticulatum is a species of sea snail, a marine gastropod mollusc in the family Chilodontidae.

Description

The height of the shell attains 17 mm.

Distribution
This species occurs in the Southwest Indian Ocean and off Madagascar.

References

External links
 To World Register of Marine Species
 

reticulatum
Gastropods described in 2012